Flying Finn Ltd was a low cost airline, based at Helsinki-Vantaa Airport, Finland. It ceased operations in 2004.

History 

The airline was established in December 2002 and started operations on 16 March 2003. Its cheap air fares were based on the fact that the e-tickets were only sold through Internet and phone. The airline claimed a successful beginning, as the passengers who formerly bought bus and train tickets now bought cheaper flights.

The president of the company was Peter Sevelius. The flight captains had been employed from Finnair. It had many celebrities as shareholders, such as the rally driver Juha Kankkunen. Its competitors included Finnair, Ryanair and Soder Airlines.

In January 2004, faced with the threat of the termination of its plane lease and operating license for unpaid debts, the financially ailing airline cancelled its flights to London and went into debt restructuring. On January 27, 2004, Flying Finn ceased all flights and filed for bankruptcy. Over 20,000 passengers were left without refund.

In August 2007, there was speculation by Keskusrikospoliisi (the National Bureau of Investigation) that there are financial irregularities due to the airline accounts, leading to seven former employees being accused of breaking bankruptcy laws.

Services 

Flying Finn operated daily flights between Helsinki and Oulu.  It also ran limited services between Helsinki and Rovaniemi, Kuopio and London Stansted.

Fleet 

The Flying Finn fleet consisted of 2 leased McDonnell Douglas MD-83 aircraft which originated from Finnair.

References

External links
Flying Finn Former Fleet Detail

2002 establishments in Finland
2004 disestablishments in Finland
Airlines established in 2002
Airlines disestablished in 2004
Defunct airlines of Finland
Defunct European low-cost airlines
European Low Fares Airline Association
Finnish companies established in 2002